South Milford is an unincorporated community in Milford Township, LaGrange County, Indiana.

History
South Milford was laid out in 1856. South Milford lies in the southern part of Milford Township, hence the name.

Geography

References

Unincorporated communities in LaGrange County, Indiana
Unincorporated communities in Indiana